“Best Friends Forever” is a phrase that describes a close friendship. It is often written as an initialism, "BFF".

Definition
A BFF is a term for someone's best friend or close friend and is characterized by trust and permanence, irrespective of the number of times the meaning of friendship has been changed in their lives. BFFs are usually in close contact and have shared experiences, such as attending the same school or sharing musical tastes. Relationships described as BFF are common in high school & middle school and often decline when the parties go to college. The term BFF does not necessarily convey exclusivity; depending on a person's individual interpretation or philosophy of the concept of "BFF", an individual may not have more than one BFF simultaneously.

Origin
In a 1997 episode of Friends (S3 E25), Phoebe uses the term BFF and has to explain to the rest of the gang that it means "best friends forever". Although the concept of having or being a "best friend" is ageless, the acronym BFF was popularized as a quick way for friends to sign off and express their positive feelings for one another while instant-messaging (IM-ing) on the computer or sending a text message on cell phones.

The acronym "BFF" was added to the New Oxford American Dictionary on 16 September 2010. The Oxford English Dictionary documents a use of BFF in 1978.

Cultural perception
According to a survey in France, the BFF friendship is a concept that occupies a certain place on social networks. This value is reassuring, especially for the millennial generation that experiences a divorce frequently. It is a sign of social success and a balanced life.

A large survey of friendship in the UK in 2003 found that on average, people had nine close friends. In elementary and middle school, best friendships often last less than one full academic year.

Barbara Delinsky described a BFF as "someone you don't have to see every day to still connect with, someone who loves you whether you talk often or not, someone who would drop everything and catch the next flight if you needed her. It's someone who couldn't care less where or what she eats, as long as she's with you."

Academic studies
In 2010, the BFF concept was a part of a BFF contract "to encourage the signatories to work through their differences before splitting up."

In a study conducted at the University of Oxford, Tamas David-Barrett and his colleagues reported that there is an unusually large number of profile pictures on Facebook that depict two women. This pattern is present in each region of the world. After eliminating the alternative hypotheses, the study concluded that the finding suggests that (a) close friendship formation patterns are universal among humans, and (b) there is a marked gender difference in the propensity to form lasting friendship due to an evolutionary ultimate cause. This suggests that the BFF concept, albeit with a different name, may exist in many cultures, going back to evolutionary times. Recent studies have also shown that close friends are treated as siblings throughout the lifespan.

Commercial use 
Coca-Cola has used the expression on some of their products. For example, some of their cans and bottles say, "Share a Diet Coke with your BFF".

References

Friendship
English-language idioms